The Belfast & Moosehead Lake Railroad  was a standard-gauge shortline railroad that operated from 1871 to 2007 over a single-track grade from Belfast to Burnham Junction in Maine.

Chartered in 1867, the line was built between August 1868 and December 1870 by the Belfast and Moosehead Lake Railroad Company (B&MLRR), which was majority-owned by the city of Belfast until 1991. For its first 55 years, the road was operated under lease by the Maine Central as its Belfast Branch, which provided daily passenger and freight service to eight stations over the length of Waldo County, Maine. After the MEC cancelled its lease in 1925, the B&MLRR began running trains under its own name. Passenger operations ceased in March 1960, although in 1988, the railroad began operating summer tourist trains to offset a decline in freight traffic. In 1991, the city sold its interest in the money-losing railroad to private owners. In 2007, the railroad ended operations as the B&MLRR.

Today, the line is operated by the non-profit Brooks Preservation Society as the Belfast & Moosehead Lake Railway, and runs weekend excursion trains in the spring, summer and early fall between City Point, Waldo, and Brooks.

Organization and construction
The first attempt to bring a railroad to Belfast, a Penobscot Bay port city that was Waldo County's shire town, came on March 9, 1836, when the Maine Legislature passed "An Act to establish the Belfast and Quebec Railroad Company", but any prospects for financing the project were quickly killed by a provision in the Maine Constitution that prohibited public loans to build railroads and by the Panic of 1837.  A second attempt to raise funds for the Quebec route in 1845 also failed, as did an 1848 proposal for a line from Belfast to Waterville, and an 1853 proposal for a line from Belfast via Newport, Dexter, and Dover, to Greenville on the shores of Moosehead Lake.

In 1867, a change in state law finally made it possible for cities and towns to help finance railroads through bond issues. The 47th Maine Legislature soon passed a bill to charter the Belfast and Moosehead Lake Railroad Company, which was signed by Governor Joshua L. Chamberlain on February 28, 1867.

On April 6, 1867, and March 28, 1868, the people of Belfast voted by margins of 865-27 and 854–50, respectively, to authorize the city to issue 30-year, 6-percent bonds to finance their purchase of B&MLRR stock. The bond money bought a total of 5,004 shares of preferred (1,400) and non-preferred (3,604) stock at $100 per share. This would eventually represent 83% of the company's outstanding shares, the rest of which were purchased by several other towns along the line (Brooks, Unity, and Thorndike), and by about 100 private investors, mostly from Belfast and Boston. The corporation was formally organized on July 3, 1867, and after a year of planning, making detailed surveys, and acquiring additional financing, a contract was let to Ellis, Wilson and Hogan Co. of Canada on July 8, 1868, to build the line at a cost of $25,900 per mile.

Ground was broken on the Belfast waterfront on August 4, 1868, at what would become the site of the road's terminal and main yard (milepost "0") for the next 138 years. The railroad's "Last Spike" was driven near Brooks on September 24, 1870, completing a line that stretched 33.07 miles from Belfast inland to Burnham Junction.

Operations

MEC Belfast Branch (1871–1925)

As the name of the railroad suggests, the original intent was to build the line 88 miles inland to Greenville on Moosehead Lake. Instead, the Maine Central Railroad leased the road, which connected with the MEC's Portland-Bangor main line at Burnham Junction. Located at the far end of Waldo County, the connection was at milepost 97 of the MEC main line, some 14 miles northeast of Waterville (MP 83) and 41 miles southwest of Bangor (MP 138).

Beginning on December 23, 1870, the MEC ran the line as its Belfast Branch. The railroad prospered under the MEC, with three daily round trips for passengers. Most freight during this period was southbound, consisting largely of grain for poultry production in the area, as well as smaller amounts of fish oil, leather, coal, lumber and fertilizer. Outbound freight originally included a large amount of processed fish from Belfast's processing plants; shoes and other manufactured goods from Belfast; farm products from Waldo, Brooks, Knox, and Thorndike; and milk from the Turner Center Creamery in Unity.

B&MLRR (1926–2007)
With the decline in American railroad profitability in the 20th century, the Maine Central discontinued its lease of the Belfast Branch on January 1, 1926. The operation of the newly independent Belfast and Moosehead Lake Railroad fell to the city of Belfast, and for the first time, the B&MLRR began running trains under its own name.

In the 1950s and 1960s, much of the freight was chicken feed for the area's poultry houses. The railroad dieselised in 1946 and scrapped its last steam locomotive (BML#19) in 1950. Through this period, the railroad continued to decline. Passenger service ceased on March 9, 1960, after the B&ML lost its U.S. Mail (RPO) contract. There was a burst of good freight business in the 1970s, but by 1990, freight traffic had ceased as well. In the early 1990s, heritage railroad tourist trains began running.

Tourist railroad
In 1991, the city sold its shares of the money-losing operation. The railroad changed hands rapidly since then. It operated diesel excursion runs from Belfast to Waldo and diesel-and steam-powered trains from Unity to Burnham Junction.

The railroad's relations with the city of Belfast deteriorated. In 1995, it built a new station in Unity (MP 24.95) and moved its headquarters there. The year also saw the railroad purchase a steam locomotive, SJ B number 1149, from the Swedish State Railways for its Unity excursions.

In 2004, the railroad ceased operations from Belfast; the following year, the city evicted the railroad from its waterfront yard after the company failed to make lease payments on the property. The yard's turntable and tracks there were pulled up and sold off; the site is now occupied by the Front Street Ship Yard. The railroad suspended operations in 2007.

In February 2009, the Brooks Preservation Society (BPS) entered into an agreement with the Maine Department of Transportation to lease and restore the Belfast & Moosehead Lake Railroad corridor with the intent of restoring railroad activity to Waldo County. BPS began railroad operations under the name Belfast & Moosehead Lake Railway, then changed to Belfast and Moosehead Lake Railroad.

Present Day Operations

Passenger trains begin at the BML's headquarters in Unity, Maine. Regular trains depart at 11 a.m. and 1:30 p.m. These trains generally head west past Unity Pond, through the Burnham Bog, and then reverse back to Unity Station and Depot. Eastbound trains will terminate either at the Maine Organic Farmers and Gardeners Association Station in Thorndike, ME, or Farwell General Store, also located in Thorndike. Trains run nearly year round, with the winter season picking up in late February, and running through the winter holiday season.

Rail Bike rides are also operated in conjunction with normal trains, only during the summer season. These are pedal-powered carts that ride the rails, with accommodations for two riders per bike along with a baggage compartment.

Special event trains such as "The Great Train Robbery," "The Santa Express," and "Fall Foliage Special," run in addition to the normal rides. These are often extended rides, and typically run for a longer duration of time.

Present Day Preservation Efforts

Over the course of 2018–2021, the BML began acquiring several new pieces of Maintenance of Way equipment. Much was purchased through auction, along with in coordination with the Canadian Pacific Railway in Derby, ME. (Formerly the Central Maine and Quebec Railway). The railroad has been host to many elderly machines from the Bangor and Aroostook Railroad, Montreal, Maine and Atlantic Railway, Canadian American Railroad, and also CSX Transportation. Much of which has been repaired and refurbished for mainline operation, and has aided in tie renewal efforts by the BML, along with the Maine State DOT.

Recent achievements include tie renewal to the point of trackage being FRA Class 1 conditions from the line's western terminus at Burnham Junction, to Thorndike Yard, the location of one of the town's former chicken feed mills, ditching and culvert replacement along the entire rail corridor, tree clearing to allow for safe passage of trains, the full restoration of one former Maine Central Railroad Pullman passenger car, along with a Swedish State Railways dining car, the near full restoration of BML locomotive 53, and replacement and repair of several grade crossings.

Locomotives

References

External links
 Bangor Daily News, Brooks rail restoration on track Preservation society plans summer locomotive, rail bike tours, February 4, 2009.
 The Brooks Preservation Society.
 Belfast and Moosehead Lake Railroad.
 BMLRR.com (An extensive illustrated history of the Belfast & Moosehead Lake Railroad)
 Preservation Society Leasing B&ML Rail Line. Visited March 2, 2009.
 Video from WCHS channel 6 Portland. Preservation Society Leasing B&ML Rail Line.  Starting this Spring, people will be able to tour Waldo County by train. Visited March 2, 2009.
 Video from WCHS channel 6 Portland. Old Rail Station Gets Revamped The Belfast and Moosehead Lake Railroad is a 140-year-old piece of Maine's history.  Visited March 2, 2009.
 BML Grade Belfast to Burnham Jt (1989) BML54/MEC606 Pt. 1
 BML Grade Belfast to Burnham Jt (1989) BML54/MEC606 Pt. 2
 BML Grade Belfast to Burnham Jt (1989) BML53/MEC606 Pt. 3
 The Deisel Shop Belfast & Moosehead Lake diesel locomotive roster.

Defunct Maine railroads
Transportation in Waldo County, Maine
Maine railroads
Rail infrastructure in Maine
Belfast, Maine
1871 establishments in Maine
2007 disestablishments in Maine